Ernest William Wright (29 December 1907 – 1977) was an English professional footballer who played in the Football League for Mansfield Town.

References

1907 births
1977 deaths
English footballers
Association football defenders
English Football League players
Huddersfield Town A.F.C. players
Bradford City A.F.C. players
Mansfield Town F.C. players
Boston United F.C. players